The Richmond County District Attorney is the elected district attorney for Richmond County, coterminous with the Borough of Staten Island, in New York City. The office is responsible for the prosecution of violations of New York state laws, as violations of federal law in Richmond County are prosecuted by the U.S. Attorney for the Eastern District of New York. The current District Attorney is Michael McMahon.

History
In a legislative act of February 12, 1796, New York State was divided into seven districts, each with its own Assistant Attorney General. Richmond County was part of the First District, which also included Kings, Queens, Suffolk, and Westchester counties. At that time, Queens County included much of present-day Nassau County, and Westchester County included present-day Bronx County. The Assistant Attorney General was renamed District Attorney on April 4, 1801, and New York County was added to the First District. Westchester was separated from the First District in 1813, and New York County was separated in 1815. The 13 districts that existed were divided so that each county became its own district by a law passed on April 21, 1818.

Until 1822, the district attorney was appointed by the Council of Appointment, and held the office "during the Council's pleasure", meaning that there was no defined term of office. Under the provisions of the New York State Constitution of 1821, the D.A. was appointed to a three-year term by the County Court, and under the provisions of the Constitution of 1846, the office became elective by popular ballot.

In case of a vacancy, the Governor of New York appoints an interim district attorney who serves until a successor is elected at the next annual election. The term was increased to four years for the Richmond County District Attorney in 1937.

List of District Attorneys

References

External links

1818 establishments in New York (state)
Richmond County District Attorneys